Karsibór (formerly  or Caseburg) is an island in the Szczecin Lagoon, Poland, which was created by the cutting of the Piast Canal which separated it from the island of Usedom. The island was named after its largest village (now district of the town of Świnoujście).

In 1880, the Kaiserfahrt (Piast Canal) channel was opened providing a water route with a depth of  connecting the lagoon with the Baltic Sea bypassing the eastern part of the Świna arm (Old Świna) of the Oder River, allowing large ships quicker and safer enter the lagoon and the seaport of Szczecin than on the natural river.

After the defeat of Germany in World War II, under the terms of the Potsdam Agreement, in 1945 the region became part of Poland, which renamed the canal after the Piast dynasty.

There is a memorial to the British pilots of the No. 617 Squadron RAF, who were shot down by the Nazis in April 1945.

Images 

Islands of Poland
Landforms of West Pomeranian Voivodeship